Obuchowski (feminine: Obuchowska; plural: Obuchowscy) is a Polish surname. Notable people with this surname include:

 David Obuchowski, American rock musician
  (born 1933), Polish horse breeder and politician
  (1932–2016), Polish psychologist
 , Polish ophthalmologist
  (1931–2014), Polish psychologist
 Michael J. Obuchowski (born 1952), American politician
 Nancy Obuchowski (born 1962), American biostatistician and radiologist
 , Polish revolutionary, participant in the November Uprising of 1830

See also
 

Polish-language surnames